is a Japanese manga series written and illustrated by Motomi Minamoto. It was serialized in Shogakukan's shōnen manga magazine Monthly Shōnen Sunday from June 2018 to June 2022.

Publication
Written and illustrated by Motomi Minamoto, Sensei wa Koi wo Oshie Rarenai was serialized in Shogakukan's shōnen manga magazine Monthly Shōnen Sunday from June 12, 2018, to June 10, 2022. Shogakukan has collected its chapters into individual tankōbon volumes. The first volume was released on June 12, 2019. As of September 12, 2022, seven volumes have been released.

Volume list

References

External links
 

Romantic comedy anime and manga
Shogakukan manga
Shōnen manga
Teaching anime and manga